Sumter Historic District is a national historic district located at Sumter, Sumter County, South Carolina.  It encompasses 62 contributing buildings in the central business district of Sumter.  It includes buildings that primarily date from 1880 to 1912.  They are typical of turn-of-the-20th century commercial buildings, using materials such as pressed tin, limestone, and brick. Notable buildings include the Sumter County Courthouse, Sumter Town Hall-Opera House, Lee and Moise Building, Bultman Brothers' Boots and Shoes, Bank of Sumter, and Burns Hardware.

It was added to the National Register of Historic Places in 1975.

References

Romanesque Revival architecture in South Carolina
Neoclassical architecture in South Carolina
Buildings and structures in Sumter County, South Carolina
National Register of Historic Places in Sumter County, South Carolina
Historic districts on the National Register of Historic Places in South Carolina